RBK may refer to:
Rebecca Bauer-Kahan, state assemblyperson for California's 16th State Assembly district
Reebok, a company specializing in sportswear and goods, or a brand of sportswear made by Reebok.
Rosenborg BK (Rosenborg Ballklub), a Norwegian football club
Royal Borough of Kingston upon Thames, in Greater London
Rögle BK (Rögle Bandyklubb), an ice hockey club from Sweden
Rheinisch-Bergischer Kreis, a district of North Rhine-Westphalia in Germany
RBK-250, a Soviet-era cluster bomb
RBK-500, a Soviet-era cluster bomb
RBK Group, a Russian media group
RBK TV, a TV channel owned by the group
RBK Daily, a newspaper publisher by the group
IATA airport code for French Valley Airport